Longzhou County     Zhuang: Lungzcouh Yen) is a county of southwestern Guangxi, China, bordering Cao Bằng province, Vietnam. It is under the jurisdiction of the prefecture-level city of Chongzuo.

Longzhou lies in a circular valley at the junction of the Xun and Gui rivers.

Geography and climate
Longzhou has a monsoon-influenced humid subtropical climate (Köppen Cwa), with short, mild winters, and long, very hot and humid summers. Winter begins dry but becomes progressively wetter and cloudier. Spring is generally overcast and often rainy, while summer continues to be rainy though is the sunniest time of year. Autumn is sunny and dry. The annual rainfall is just above , a majority of which is delivered from June to August. With monthly percent possible sunshine ranging from 16% in February and March to 50% in September, the county receives 1,583 hours of bright sunshine annually.

Divisions
Towns

 Longzhou (龙州镇)
 Xiadong (下冻镇)
 Shuikou (水口镇)
 Jinlong(金龙镇)
 Xiangshui(响水镇)

Townships

 Bajiao(八角乡)
 Shangjiang(上降乡)
 Binqiao(彬桥乡)
 Shanglong(上龙乡)
 Wude(武德乡)
 Zhubu(逐卜乡)
 Shangjin(上金乡)

References

Counties of Guangxi
Chongzuo
China–Vietnam border crossings